The Vidunda are a matrilineal Bantu ethnolinguistic group based in Kilosa District of Morogoro Region, Tanzania. The Vidunda live in south of Mikumi and north of the Great Ruaha River, including in the Uvidunda Mountains. The Vidunda population was estimated to number 90,000.

References

Ethnic groups in Tanzania